Israzorides is a genus of spiders in the family Miturgidae. It was first described in 2003 by Levy. , it contains only one species, Israzorides judaeus, from Israel.

References

Miturgidae
Monotypic Araneomorphae genera
Spiders of Asia